A Speculative instrument is an instrument which has been designed to aid those undertaking a speculative or investigative task. The English philosopher and literary critic, I. A. Richards is the principle person responsible for developing the concept. He published a collection of essays entitled Speculative Instruments in 1955.

Origins of the term
The term appears in William Shakespeare's play Othello. However, the first two printed versions of the play exhibit differences in the relevant passage. Thus textual criticism can lead to a variety of interpretations:

However as the term "theory" in itself derives from a metaphorical use of a greek word more generally used as regards viewing and spectating, these difference can both be seen as lying within that metaphoric range. As Francis Sibley remarks: "the concept of speculative instruments is itself a speculative instrument and hence fluid, not static."

References

Literary criticism